Fritz Kortner (born Fritz Nathan Kohn; 12 May 1892 – 22 July 1970) was an Austrian stage and film actor and theatre director.

Life and career

Kortner was born in Vienna as Fritz Nathan Kohn into a Jewish family. He studied at the Vienna Academy of Music and Dramatic Art. After graduating, he joined Max Reinhardt in Berlin in 1911 and then Leopold Jessner in 1916. After his breakthrough performance in Ernst Toller's Transfiguration in 1919, he became one of Germany's best-known character actors and the nation's foremost performer of Expressionist works. He also appeared in over ninety films beginning in 1916.

His specialty was in playing sinister and threatening roles, although he also appeared in the title role of Dreyfus (1930).  He originally gained attention for his explosive energy on stage and his powerful voice; but as the 1920s progressed, his work began to incorporate greater realism, as he opted for a more controlled delivery and greater use of gestures.

With the coming to power of the Nazis, Kortner fled Germany in 1933 with is wife, actress Johanna Hofer, returning first to his native Vienna and, from there, on to Great Britain, and finally, in 1937, to the United States, where he found work as a character actor and theater director.

He returned to Germany in 1949, where he became noted for his innovative staging and direction of classics by William Shakespeare and Molière, such as a Richard III (1964) in which the king crawls over piles of corpses at the finale.

Death
Kortner died at Munich in 1970, aged 78, of leukemia.

Selected filmography

 Manya, die Türkin (1915)
 Im Banne der Vergangenheit (1915)
 Das Geheimnis von D.14 (1915)
 Police Nr. 1111 (1915) – Mac Waldy
 Das zweite Leben (1916)
 Martyr of His Heart (1918) – Ludwig van Beethoven
 The Other I (1918) – Professor
 Frauenehre (1918, Short) – Mathias Enger
 Der Sonnwendhof (1918)
 Else of Erlenhof (1919)
 The Eye of the Buddha (1919) – indischer Diener
 Without Witnesses (1919)
 Satan (1920) – Pharao Amenhotep
 Gerechtigkeit (1920)
 Va banque (1920) – S. M. Wulff
 The Brothers Karamazov (1921) – Der alte Karamasoff
 Catherine the Great (1920) – Potemkin
 The Skull of Pharaoh's Daughter (1920)
 Weltbrand (1920) – Iwan Becker
 The Night of Queen Isabeau (1920) – Connetable
 Die Verschleierte (1920)
 Christian Wahnschaffe (1920)
 The Maharaja's Favourite Wife (1921) – Bruder von Maharadscha Bhima
 The Strongest Instinct (1921)
 The Railway King (1921)
 The House on the Moon (1921) – Jan van Haag – Wachsfigurenhändler
 The House of Torment (1921) – Arzt
 Hashish, the Paradise of Hell (1921) – Sultan
 The Conspiracy in Genoa (1921) – Gianettino
 Country Roads and the Big City (1921) – Mendel Hammerstein
 Danton (1921)
 Aus dem Schwarzbuch eines Polizeikommissars (1921) – Der Krüppel
 The Hunt for the Truth (1921)
 Backstairs (1921) – Der Postbote
 The Railway King (1921)
 On the Red Cliff (1922) – Henning Rinkens
 Luise Millerin (1922) – Miller
 The Earl of Essex (1922) – Lord Nottingham
 Peter the Great (1922) – Patriarch Adrian
 A Dying Nation (1922)
 The Call of Destiny (1922)
 What Belongs to Darkness (1922) – Gangster
 At the Edge of the Great City (1922)
 Nora (1923) – Krogstadt, Lawyer
 Schatten – Eine nächtliche Halluzination (1923) – The count
 A Woman, an Animal, a Diamond (1923) – Urmensch
 Le revenant au baiser mortel (1923)
 Poor Sinner (1923) – Canary
 The Hands of Orlac (1924) – Nera
 Modern Marriages (1924) – Diener
 Kiedy kobieta zdradza meza (1924) – Lokaj
 Doctor Wislizenus (1924) – Dr. Wislizenus
 Should We Be Silent? (1926) – Der annoncierender Arzt
 The Life of Beethoven (1927) – Ludwig van Beethoven
 Mata Hari (1927) – Graf Bobrykin
 Students' Love (1927) – Karsten
 Alpine Tragedy (1927) – Mairas Vater
 Caught in Berlin's Underworld (1927) – Lord
 The Mistress of the Governor (1927) – Zarewitsch Alexander / Gouverneurs Sohn
 Mary Stuart (1927) – Marschall Bothwell
 Draga Maschin (1927)
 Dame Care (1928) – Der alte Meyhöfer
 Odette (1928) – Frontenac
 Spy of Madame Pompadour (1928) – Zar Paul von Rußland
 The Last Night (1928) – Montaloup
 Pandora's Box (1929) – Dr. Ludwig Schön
 Somnambul (1929) – Fabrikant Bingen
 The Woman One Longs For (1929) – Dr. Karoff
 The Woman in the Advocate's Gown (1929) – Konsul Backhaug
 The Ship of Lost Souls (1929) – Kapitän Vela – Captain Fernando Vela
 The Night of Terror (1929) – Prince Wagarin
 Atlantik (1929) – Heinrich Thomas, author
 Giftgas (1929) – Konzernpräsident Straaten
 The Other (1930) – Prosecutor Hallers
 Dreyfus (1930) – Alfred Dreyfus
 Menschen im Käfig (1930) – Captain Kell
 The Great Longing (1930) – Himself, Fritz Kortner
 The Virtuous Sinner (1931, director)
 Danton (1931) – Danton
 The Murderer Dimitri Karamazov (1931) – Dimitri Karamasoff
 You Don't Forget Such a Girl (1932, director)
 Chu Chin Chow (1934) – Abu Hasan
 Little Friend (1934) – Giant
 Evensong (1934) – Arthur Kober
 Abdul the Damned (1935) – Sultan Abdul Hamid II / Kelar – his double
 The Crouching Beast (1935) – Ahmed Bey
 Pagliacci (1936, writer)
 Midnight Menace (1937) – Minister Peters of Grovnia
 The Purple V (1943) – Thomas Forster
 The Strange Death of Adolf Hitler (1943) – Bauer
 The Hitler Gang (1944) – Gregor Strasser
 The Wife of Monte Cristo (1946) – Maillard
 Somewhere in the Night (1946) – Anzelmo aka Dr. Oracle
 The Razor's Edge (1946) – Kosti
 The Brasher Doubloon (1947) – Rudolph Vannier
 Berlin Express (1948) – Franzen
 The Vicious Circle (1948) – Joseph Schwartz
 The Last Illusion (1949) – Professor Mauthner
 The Orplid Mystery (1950) – Mr. P. L. Hoopman
 Bluebeard (1951) – Haushofsmeister
 Secrets of the City (1955, director)
 Sarajevo (1955, director)
  (1961, TV film, director)
 Clavigo (1970, TV film, director)

Autobiographical works 
1971: Letzten Endes. Fragmente. (posthumous autobiography, edited by Johanna Kortner)
1996: Aller Tage Abend. Autobiographie. Droemer-Knaur, München, 1996, .
 Aller Tage Abend. Autobiographie. Alexander Verlag, Berlin 2005, .
2005: Aller Tage Abend. Auszüge, gelesen von Fritz Kortner. Alexander Verlag, Berlin .

References
Notes

Bibliography
 Critchfield, Richard D. From Shakespeare to Frisch: The Provocative Fritz Kortner. Heidelberg: Synchron Publishers, 2008. ;

External links 
 
 Virtual History – Photographs

1892 births
1970 deaths
Jewish German male actors
German-language film directors
German male silent film actors
German theatre directors
Austrian Jews
Austrian theatre directors
Male actors from Vienna
Knights Commander of the Order of Merit of the Federal Republic of Germany
Recipients of the Pour le Mérite (civil class)
Jewish emigrants from Nazi Germany to the United States
20th-century German male actors
Deaths from leukemia
Burials at Munich Waldfriedhof